This article lists seasons played in the second tier of English football from 1992–93, when the old Football League First Division was replaced by the Premier League as the top-level. Football League Division One was renamed the Football League Championship from 2004–05.

Seasons

Notes

References